Aḥmad ibn ‘Imād al-Dīn, Ahmad ibn Imad ad-Din was a Persian physician and alchemist. He was probably from Nishapur in the 11th century.

He was the author of an alchemical treatise titled On the Art of the Elixir (or Fi sina‘at al-iksir) which is preserved in the National Library of Medicine.

No other copy has been identified, and the author is not listed in the published bibliographies of Islamic writers on alchemy. He wrote the alchemical treatise titled On the Art of the Elixir (or Fi sina‘at al-iksir), in which he describes various Chemical Reactions.

The manuscript copy is undated, but appears to be of the 17th or 18th century. In it, there is extensive marginalia giving citations from Jābir ibn Hayyān.

See also
List of Iranian scientists
Medical Encyclopedia of Islam and Iran

References

11th-century alchemists
11th-century Iranian physicians
Alchemists of the medieval Islamic world
Physicians from Nishapur
Date of death unknown
Year of birth unknown
Persian alchemists
Iranian chemists